Glòria Bordons de Porrata-Doria (born 22 September 1953 in Barcelona) is a Spanish art historian, pedagogue, and philologist. She is considered an expert on the works of Joan Brossa, having published three books on his works.

References 

1953 births
Living people
Spanish art historians
Spanish philologists